ROAC may refer to:
rape of a child, see statutory rape
Reformed Old Apostolic Church
Rock of Ages Corporation
Roosevelt Academy (website roac.nl prior to becoming University College Roosevelt and moving to ucr.nl)
Russian Orthodox Autonomous Church
Royal Army Ordnance Corps